Sixty county courts in Wales have closed since the modern system of county courts in England and Wales was established by the County Courts Act 1846. The Act created 491 courts on 60 circuits; of these, 53 courts were in Wales and Monmouthshire, a Welsh county that had ambiguous status at the time and was sometimes treated as being in England. Since then, new courts have been opened in various locations, and 80 towns and cities in Wales have, or have had, county courts. As of 2012, there are 20 county courts in Wales. Reasons for closure have included a decision that it was "inexpedient" to continue to provide a court, the volume of business no longer justifying a court, or the state of the building housing the court. The first closure was Fishguard in 1856. The most recent closures are the county courts in Aberdare and Pontypool, which closed on 1 August 2011.

History
The modern system of county courts in England and Wales dates from the County Courts Act 1846, which received Royal Assent on 28 August 1846 and was brought into force on 15 March 1847. England and Wales (with the exception of the City of London, which was outside the scope of the Act) were divided into 60 circuits, with a total of 491 courts. Four of these circuits were wholly in Wales, as were 46 of these courts. A further seven courts were located in Monmouthshire (which had at the time an ambiguous status and was sometimes treated as being part of England) and these seven courts were part of a circuit for Monmouthshire and Herefordshire. One county court judge was appointed to each circuit, assisted by one or more registrars with some limited judicial powers, and would travel between the courts in his area as necessary, sitting in each court at least once a month. Few permanent courts were needed initially, given the infrequency of court hearings, and temporary accommodation such as a town hall would often be used where there was no existing courthouse for use.

Over time, although new courts have been opened in various locations, there has been a reduction in the number of locations where a county court is held. In all, 80 towns and cities in Wales have held county courts since 1847; 60 have closed and, as of 2012, 20 county courts in Wales are still open. The most recent opening of a county court took place in Caerphilly in 1965, although this closed in 2000. The first county court to close was Fishguard, in 1856. The latest county courts to close in Wales were Aberdare and Pontypool in 2011. Newbridge was the location of a county court for the shortest period – for only five months in 1856. Blaenavon is the only town in Wales to have a county court close and then reopen, both events taking place in 1938.

Courts have been closed for various reasons. The county courts at Fishguard, Ruabon and Cowbridge were closed because it was considered "inexpedient" to continue to hold courts there. In other cases, it was thought that it would be "of advantage to the public" to move the location of a court: the court at Pembroke was replaced by one at Pembroke Dock and the court at Newbridge was replaced by one at Pontypridd for this reason. The volume of court business declined during the Second World War and some little-used courts, including Presteigne and Llandeilo, were closed as a result.

There has been pressure to close courts for economic reasons since the 19th century. In 1872, more than 300 of the county courts in England and Wales cost more to run than they received in fees, but widespread closures were politically impossible. In 1899, there were proposals to close courts where fewer than 20 claims were issued per year, but these plans were frustrated by local pressure to keep courts open, since having a county court in a town was generally regarded as a mark of the town's importance. A review of the provision of county courts after the First World War concluded that Mid Wales had an "unjustifiably generous" number of county courts, but only one (Llangollen) was proposed for closure, given the need to maintain courts in rural areas.

More recently, considerations in deciding whether to close a court have included "the costs and practical implications of running a court, the public facilities, waiting times, workload levels and the overall standard of service that can be made available over the area as a whole". Monmouth, for example, was based in the Shire Hall until it was closed in 2002 because of the poor standard of the court accommodation, the lack of access for people with disabilities and the high cost to run the court compared with the use it received. The Government estimated in March 2000 that the closure of 55 county courts in England and Wales (including 9 courts in Wales) in the previous 6 years had saved a minimum of £6 million, through reductions in rent and accommodation charges, running costs and judicial expense.

In June 2010, the Ministry of Justice announced plans to close 54 county courts and 103 magistrates' courts in England and Wales, in order to save £15m in annual running costs and £22m in necessary maintenance. The courts threatened with closure in Wales were Aberdare, Llangefni, Pontypool and Rhyl. In addition, it was proposed that Newport County Court would no longer hold hearings at Chepstow every fortnight (as had been done since the county court there closed in 2002). After consultation, it was decided to keep Llangefni County Court open, but the other closures were confirmed.

Closed courts

Until 1 January 1937, the full title of each court was "The County Court of (county) holden at (location/locations)", using the historic county names. Thereafter, each court was renamed as "(location/s) County Court". For brevity, the latter form is used throughout in this table, with "County Court" being abbreviated to "CC". All name changes in the table reflect changes in the locations where the court sat since, until 1 August 1983, a county court with more than one location in its title would sit at each location named.

See also
Courts of England and Wales
List of County Court venues in England and Wales

References
General
Polden, Patrick (1999). A History of the County Court, 1846–1971. Cambridge University Press. .
For the courts that opened on 15 March 1847: the Order in Council of 9 March 1847 bringing the 1846 Act into force on 15 March 1847 and establishing the original 491 county courts was published in a supplement to the London Gazette on 10 March 1847.
Specific
Save where references are given to publication in The London Gazette, the Statutory Instruments listed below were published by Her Majesty's Stationery Office and the date that the Order was made is given. Statutory Instruments from 1987 onwards are available online.

 
County Courts
Wales
County Courts in Wales
County courts in England and Wales
County Courts in Wales
County Courts in Wales
Wales law-related lists
Courts